Ndembezi is one of the villages and wards in the Igunga district of the Tabora Region in Tanzania. Ndembezi has a very long history even before colonization.

Before the coming of colonialism, people from middle east came and lived with Ndembezi people. The Arabs from Oman were the first foreigners to set foot in Ndembezi, followed by Indians and later Whitemen.

Ndembezi was one of the most prosperous place during the 1940s is Tabora region. At that time, traders from as far as Zanzibar came to trade in Ndembezi. The most prominent ones were, Ally bin Salum, Mohamed Nassor, Mohammed Said Kinanda and Hilal Mohamed. After Independence, most Arab traders shifted to Tabora, Nzega, Iborogelo, Nkinga, and Igunga. Few among them went back to their home country, Oman.

Ndembezi people have their beautiful culture in their daily life. Greetings from fellows can be heard from morning to evening. In morning time they greet Ng'wngaluka which means good morning, and in the afternoon the greet Ng'wadila means Good afternoon. Respect for others is the main feature of their culture, youngs respect adults and vice versa.

The main food for Ndembezi people is Ugali made from maize, millet or cassava flour, associated with cooked vegetables such as cassava leaves, potato leaves, and wild grown vegetables like Mlenda and Mchunga. Sometimes, in the menu there is beef, mutton, chicken or wild-hunted meat.

In drinks, Ndembezi people do make their own local beer and alcohol. The main local beer brewed is NHANGALA which is made from maize, millet or cassava and is added with honey to make it tastes sweet. Also there is non-alcoholic drink for youngs which is called TOGWA.

In entertainment, Ndembezi people do enjoy various traditional dances. The main traditional dance is MBINA, the drum beating and singing of a group of about 50 people. Mbina is divided into three opponent groups, BHAZUBHA, BHAGIKA and BHAYEYE. After harvest season, this two or three sides compete. A group leader known as N'LENGI for each side sings and dances followed by his dancers to attract viewers. The side with more viewers after several rounds will be a winner and get a prize such as cows, maize or a honey.

Ndembezi people are hardworking, they cultivate maize, millet, yams, rice and domesticate animals such as cattle, sheep and goats also they keep chicken and domestic pets like dogs and cats.

The people in this village do worship in different ways, there are Muslims, Christians, non-believers and traditionalists, with their places of worship. The greater number are traditionalists, followed non-believers, Christians and the last are Muslims. Although, they differ in faith, Ndembezi people do share their happiness and sorrow. In burial and wedding they are together.

In dealing with eradication of ignorance among its people. Ndembezi leaders work hand-in-hand with their councillor Abubakar Shaabani Abdallah to ensure that all children who are six to ten years old must go to school. There are three primary school in Ndembezi and a secondary school.

In health care, Ndembezi has a dispensary from mid 1980s which serves about 16,000 people per year. There is one doctor, three nurses and one laboratory attendant.

One of the greatest achievements of Ndembezi was its village-son Hon. Charles Shija Kabeho who was a member of parliament for Igunga constituency and a minister of education and culture of Tanzania. The late Kabeho died in 1994 and his seat was taken by Hon. Rostam Abdulmansul Aziz, Member of Parliament from 1994 to 2011, when he resigned and his position was taken by a geologist Hon. Dr. Dalaly Peter Kafumu from Itumba village in Igunga District.

The most famous old men in Ndembezi ward are, Maalim Shabani Abdallah, Mzee Ng'wananhanzagila, Mzee Hussein Simbachai, Mzee Athumani Sollo Nguku, Mzee Majid Nassor, Michael Maganga kanunha and many others.

In sports, there are only football teams in Ndembezi, the teams are Ndembezi rangers, Kabhisu Stars, Ndembezi secondary team, and primary schools teams. The football stars in Ndembezi are, Rajabu Bakari, Juma Bakari, Swedi Hamisi, Fundi Hamisi and Abdallah Abuu and Ramadhani Ndolaga.

Ndembezi will remain the most important village in Igunga district in the coming years.

Wards of Tabora Region